The 2009 UCI Track Cycling World Championships are the World Championship for track cycling. They took place at the BGŻ Arena in Pruszków, Poland from 25 to 29 March 2009. Nineteen events were on the programme, with the women's omnium being added to the eighteen events contested at the 2008 championships.

Australia topped the medal table with four gold medals, with France on second and Great Britain on third place.

In the Men's events, Michael Mørkøv and Alex Rasmussen, both of Denmark, and Grégory Baugé of France took home two gold medals while Australian Cameron Meyer took home a gold and two silver medals.
For the women, Simona Krupeckaitė of Lithuania won three medals; a gold and two bronzes. Victoria Pendleton and Elizabeth Armitstead of Great Britain won three medals each; a gold, a silver, and a bronze with.

Medal table

Medal summary

See also

 Cycling at the 2008 Summer Olympics
 2008–09 UCI Track Cycling World Ranking
 2008–09 UCI Track Cycling World Cup Classics

References

External links
Results book
Track Cycling World Championships - Pruszkow, Poland, March 25-29, 2009 cycling news.com

 
Uci Track Cycling World Championships, 2009
Track cycling
UCI Track Cycling World Championships by year
Cycling
Sport in Masovian Voivodeship
March 2009 sports events in Europe